Fritz Strack (born February 6, 1950) is a German social psychologist and professor emeritus at the University of Würzburg. Strack is a member of Germany's National Academy of Sciences Leopoldina and was awarded the Ig Nobel Prize for psychology in 2019.

He was the lead author of a frequently cited 1988 study that provided support for the facial feedback hypothesis.

Study on facial feedback
Strack's study asked participants to hold a pen in their mouths in such a way as to make them either smile or frown, and then had them rate how funny a series of the Far Side cartoons were. In this study, participants who were smiling rated the cartoons as funnier, on average, compared to those who were frowning. In 2016, a study by a separate research team was published which failed to replicate the original study's results. Strack himself suggested that the negative results of the replication study may have been caused by its researchers' use of a video camera to record the participants' responses. He also took issue with the replication study's choice of the same cartoons that had originally been used in 1985. Subsequent research has supported Strack's claim that participants knowing they are being recorded by cameras led to the replication study's negative result. Further evidence has provided additional support for both the pen procedure and the validity of the facial-feedback hypothesis.

References

External links
Faculty page
Profile at Social Psychology Network

Living people
German psychologists
Social psychologists
1950 births
Academic staff of the University of Würzburg
University of Mannheim alumni
Stanford University alumni
People from Landau